Spike Island was a concert by The Stone Roses held on May 27, 1990 in Widnes, Cheshire, England. It is one of the most famous concerts ever held in the UK. It was never officially recorded, although clips have emerged online and there are rumours that the full video of the concert exists.

Support acts
The support acts included DJs, Dave Booth, MC Tunes, Dave Haslam, Paul Oakenfold and Frankie Bones, a Zimbabwean drum orchestra, a ska/rock/reggae fusion band called Ruff Ruff & Ready and the reggae artist Gary Clail.

Film
A film about the concert, called Spike Island, was released in 2012. It is set in the 1990 and follows a group of aspiring musicians on their journey to Spike Island.

References

The Stone Roses
1990 in British music
1990 in England
Concerts in the United Kingdom